Guangzhou Baiyun International Airport , formerly known as Canton Civil Airport or Pai Yuen Airport was the main airport in Guangzhou, Guangdong, China until 5 August 2004, when it was replaced by a new airport of the same title,  to the north.

History 
The airport started construction in 1932 and opened in the following year in November. During the Canton Operation, the Japanese Navy invaded the airport and expanded the runway. In 1963, the People's Liberation Army Air Force moved away from the airport, making the airport only for public use. The name of the airport is changed to "Baiyun" named from nearby Baiyun Mountain ("Baiyun" in Chinese means "white cloud"). Due to the expansion of Guangzhou, the airport could not expand to meet passengers needs. On 5 August 2004, the new Baiyun airport opened and the old airport was closed.

From 1964 to 1967, it underwent a comprehensive expansion, adding an area of 725,300 square meters, and extending the runway to 2,500 meters from 2,000 meters before it had the conditions of further navigation with foreign countries.

In the 1980s, the airport renovated and expanded facilities such as oil storage depots, aprons, terminal buildings, boarding bridges, and maintenance hangars to meet the standards of international first-class airports. After the reform and opening up, Baiyun Airport had developed rapidly. Its passenger capacity, takeoffs and landings had ranked first in mainland China for eight consecutive years. After several expansions, it was still far from meeting its demand. It was imperative to choose a new location to build a new airport.

In 1992, the airport underwent civil aviation system reform, and the airport operated as an independent economic entity.

By 2002, the passenger throughput of the old Guangzhou Baiyun International Airport had reached 16,014,400 passengers, and the cargo and mail throughput reached 592,600 tons.

The airport is surrounded by high-rise buildings and was unable to expand further. Instead, the new airport was built and opened on 5 August 2004.

Former airlines and destinations 
There are often ferry international flights to Hong Kong, even before its economic open up. Similar to its new airport, it had served a variety of domestic or foreign international airlines back in the 1980s and 1990s such as Pakistan International Airlines, Garuda Indonesia, Air France, Japan Air System, Japan Airlines, All Nippon Airways, Malaysia Airlines, Cathay Pacific, Lufthansa, Philippine Airlines, Thai Airways International, Dragonair, Singapore Airlines, Aeroflot, Baikal Airlines, Royal Air Cambodge, and nearly every domestic airlines.

Legacy 
The former terminal of the airport is being converted into a large shopping mall. The northern portion of the former airport is being turned into a provincial- and city-level functional area integrating conference services. The southern portion will be converted into Guangzhou's secondary center integrating retail, sports facilities, business, and cultural activities.

Incidents and accidents 

On the 24December 1982, CAAC Flight 2311, an  Ilyushin Il-18B was destroyed by fire after landing at the airport. Twenty-five of the 69 people on board were killed.
On 2October 1990, Xiamen Airlines Flight 8301, a Boeing 737-247, was hijacked on route to Guangzhou from Xiamen. While landing at the airport, it sideswiped a parked China Southwest Airlines Boeing 707-3J6B, and crashed into a taxiing China Southern Airlines Boeing 757-21B; of the total 225 occupants involving the aircraft, 97 survived.

See also 
 List of defunct international airports
 List of airports in Guangdong province, from 1911-current (Zh-Wiki)

References

Defunct airports in China
Airports established in 1932
Airports disestablished in 2004
1932 establishments in China
2004 disestablishments in China
Airports in Guangdong
Transport in Guangzhou
Baiyun District, Guangzhou